Osmium is the debut album of American funk band Parliament, led by George Clinton. The album has a psychedelic soul sound with a spirit of experimentation that is more similar to early Funkadelic than the later R&B-inspired Parliament albums. It was originally released in July 1970 on Invictus Records. The original vinyl release contained a glossy lyric sheet.

Since its re-release in 1990, Osmium has been distributed numerous times by various labels in the U.S., Europe and Japan, sometimes under alternate titles that have included Rhenium and First Thangs. A number of these reissues have featured material that was not included on the original album, such as unreleased tracks and singles that were recorded around the same time as Osmium.

The personnel for this album included the five Parliaments singers and the five backing musicians known as Funkadelic. The same personnel also recorded as Funkadelic, releasing that act's self-titled debut album also in 1970. After the release of Osmium, contractual difficulties prevented further recording under the name Parliament until 1974, when Clinton signed that act to Casablanca Records and positioned it as an R&B-inspired counterpoint to the more rock-oriented Funkadelic.

The yodeling that arguably uniquely identifies one of De La Soul's early hits, "Potholes in My Lawn" (which eventually appeared on De La Soul's 3 Feet High and Rising), comes from Osmium'''s "Little Ole Country Boy".

This is the only Parliament album that Ruth Copeland worked on.

Track listing
Invictus – ST-7302

Track listing for First Thangs
"Red Hot Mama"
"Come In Out of the Rain"
"Fantasy Is Reality"
"Breakdown"
"Loose Booty"
"Unfinished Instrumental"
"I Call My Baby Pussycat"
"Put Love in Your Life"
"Little Old Country Boy"
"Moonshine Heather (Takin' Care of Business)"
"Oh Lord, Why Lord/Prayer"
"My Automobile"
"There Is Nothing Before Me But Thang"
"Funky Woman"
"Livin' the Life"
"The Silent Boatmen"

Track listing for Rhenium
"Breakdown"
"I Call My Baby Pussycat"
"Put Love in Your Life"
"Little Ole Country Boy" 
"Moonshine Heather"
"Oh Lord, Why Lord/Prayer"
"Red Hot Mama"
"My Automobile"
"Nothing Before Me But Thang"
"Funky Woman"
"Livin' the Life"
"Come in Out of the Rain"
"The Silent Boatman"

Personnel
George Clinton - lead vocals in "Loose Booty", "Moonshine Heather", "Red Hot Mama", "My Automobile", "Funky Woman"
Fuzzy Haskins - lead vocals in "Fantasy Is Reality", "I Call My Baby Pussycat", "Little Old Country Boy", "My Automobile"
Calvin Simon - lead vocals in "I Call My Baby Pussycat", "Oh Lord Why Lord", "Livin' the Life"
Ray Davis - lead vocals in "I Call My Baby Pussycat", "Put Love in Your Life"
Grady Thomas - lead vocals in "I Call My Baby Pussycat"
Clyde Darnell Wilson - lead vocals in "Come in Out of the Rain", "Breakdown"
Ruth Copeland - vocals
Eddie Hazel - guitar
Tawl Ross - guitar
Billy Bass Nelson - bass guitar
Bernie Worrell - Hammond organ, piano
Tiki Fulwood - drums
Paul Franklin - Pedal Steel on "Little Ole Country Boy" Note: Personnel as listed in the album credits. Note that some songs also featured session personnel. Garry Shider (guitar), Bernie Worrell (keyboards), and Tyrone Lampkin (drums) also appeared on some non-album tracks that were included in later CD reissues of the album.

References

External links
The Motherpage
 Osmium at Discogs
 Rhenium'' at Discogs

1970 debut albums
Parliament (band) albums
Invictus Records albums